El Bouihi is a town and commune in Tlemcen Province in northwestern Algeria.

References

Communes of Tlemcen Province